is a former Nippon Professional Baseball catcher.

External links

1959 births
Living people
People from Narashino
Japanese baseball players
Nippon Professional Baseball catchers
Nippon Ham Fighters players
Chiba Lotte Marines players
Fukuoka Daiei Hawks players
Japanese baseball coaches
Nippon Professional Baseball coaches
Baseball people from Chiba Prefecture